The Animal Defence and Anti-Vivisection Society (ADAVS) was an animal rights advocacy organisation, co-founded in England, in 1903, by the animal rights advocates Lizzy Lind af Hageby, a Swedish-British feminist, and the English peeress Nina Douglas-Hamilton, Duchess of Hamilton.

History 

It was based for many years at Animal Defence House, 15 St James's Place, London, and ran a 237-acre animal sanctuary at Ferne House near Shaftesbury, Dorset, an estate owned by the Duke and Duchess of Hamilton.

The Animal Defence and Anti-Vivisection Society's executive council included Alice Drakoules who was a lifelong campaigner for animal welfare and a keen supporter of the society. She helped the society campaign for licensed slaughterhouses, humane slaughter and for an ended to performing animals.

The society came to widespread attention during the Brown Dog affair (1903–1910), which began when Lind af Hageby infiltrated the vivisection in University College London of a brown terrier dog. The subsequent description of the experiment in her book, The Shambles of Science (1903) – in which she wrote that the dog had been conscious throughout and in pain – led to a protracted scandal and a libel case, which the accused researcher won. The affair continued for several years, making a name both for Lind af Hageby and for the society.

The society was associated with Hageby's International Humanitarian Bureau. It published The Anti-Vivisection and Humanitarian Review in 1929 and Progress Today: The Humanitarian and Anti-Vivisection Review in the 1930s.

Following Lind af Hageby's death in December 1963, the society's assets were transferred to a trust, The Animal Defence Trust, which continues to offer grants for animal-protection projects.

Selected publications

Animal Defence and Anti-Vivisection Society: Reports for 1933 and 1934 (1935)
Progress Today: The Humanitarian and Anti-Vivisection Review (1937)

See also
 List of animal rights groups

References

Further reading
Gålmark, Elisabeth Lisa. Shambles of Science, Lizzy Lind af Hageby & Leisa Schartau, anti-vivisektionister 1903-1913/14. Stockholm University, 1996. 
Gålmark, Elisabeth Lisa. "Women Antivivisectionists, The Story of Lizzy Lind af Hageby and Leisa Schartau," in Animal Issues. 2000, Vol 4, No 2, pp. 1–32.
Kean, Hilda. Animal Rights: Political and Social Change in Britain since 1800. Reaktion Books, 1998.
Lansbury, Coral. The Old Brown Dog: Women, Workers, and Vivisection in Edwardian England. University of Wisconsin Press, 1985.
Mason, Peter. The Brown Dog Affair. Two Sevens Publishing, 1997.

Animal rights organizations
Animal welfare organisations based in the United Kingdom
Anti-vivisection organizations
Defunct organisations based in England
Organizations established in 1903